Golestan District is in Baharestan County, Tehran province, Iran. At the 2006 National Census, its population (as a part of Robat Karim County) was 317,731 in 78,298 households. The following census in 2011 counted 325,077 people in 89,904 households, by which time the district, together with Bostan District, had been separated from the county and Baharestan County established. At the latest census in 2016, the district had 306,726 inhabitants in 89,837 households.

References 

Baharestan County

Districts of Tehran Province

Populated places in Tehran Province

Populated places in Baharestan County